Zachary David Massey (November 14, 1864 – July 13, 1923) was an American politician and physician who represented Tennessee's 1st congressional district in 1910 and 1911.

Early life
Massey was born on November 14, 1864 in Marshall, North Carolina, the son of Robert Hardy and Tempa Arena Brown Massey. He attended the public schools.

Career
Massey taught in the public schools of Marshall from 1882 to 1886. He studied medicine in the Louisville Medical College and commenced the practice of his profession in Wears Valley, Tennessee, in 1889. He moved to Sevierville, Tennessee, in 1890.

During the Spanish–American War, Massey served as an assistant surgeon with 6th Infantry Regiment also known as the "Sixth Immunes." The unit served its term of service in the continental U.S. and Puerto Rico from 1898 to 1899.

After Massey was the postmaster of Sevierville from 1899 to 1904; he then was a member of the Tennessee Senate from 1904 to 1906.

Massey was elected as a Republican to the Sixty-first Congress to fill the vacancy caused by the death of Walter P. Brownlow. He served from November 8, 1910 to March 3, 1911, but he was not a candidate for renomination in 1910. He resumed the practice of medicine and also engaged in the real estate business.

Personal life
Massey married Sally Josephine Mullendore on November 25, 1886, and they had six children, Beulah, Roy, Blanche, Constance, Juanita, and Robert. On July 13, 1923, Massey died in Sevierville, Tennessee. He is interred at Shiloh Cemetery.

References

External links

 

1864 births
1923 deaths
Republican Party Tennessee state senators
Republican Party members of the United States House of Representatives from Tennessee
People from Marshall, North Carolina
People from Sevierville, Tennessee